Annette Edmondson (born 12 December 1991) is an Australian former cyclist who competed on the track with Cycling Australia's High Performance Unit (HPU). She also competed on the road for the  team between 2015 and 2018.

Her greatest successes were the three gold medals she won at the UCI Track Cycling World Championships in the omnium and team pursuit, a competition in which she also secured further silver medals in the omnium (2012) and team pursuit (2012 and 2013). Edmondson also competed in the London 2012 Olympics, securing a bronze medal for Australia in the women's Omnium and finishing in fourth place in the Team pursuit. At the 2014 Commonwealth Games she claimed a silver in the individual pursuit and a gold in the scratch race, her first gold medal at an international level and her first Commonwealth title. In addition, she has competed at the National Track Championships with gold medal results at an elite level since 2012 in multiple disciplines.

Early life
Edmondson was born in Adelaide, but due to her parents' careers at Royal Dutch Shell, she spent the early part of her childhood living in Malaysia, Oman and the Netherlands. However, when she was six, the family returned to her father's native land of Australia.

She attended the Victor Harbor Primary School, south of Adelaide, South Australia, later moving to St John's Grammar School in the Adelaide Hills where she took up numerous pursuits, including soccer and athletics.

Career
When she was 13, the South Australian Sports Institute visited her school and she was identified as having the physical attributes to have a potential career in cycling. After a year in the Talent Search Program, her first major win came at the 2006 National Junior Track Championships where she won two bronze medals in the Under 17 500m Time Trial and Sprint. From that point, she began to specialise in sprint cycling and as a junior won sprint events at a National and Oceania level.

In 2010, she took part in her first elite level National Championships finishing with silvers in the Team sprint, Keirin and 500m TT as well as a bronze in the Individual sprint.

However, Edmondson began to lose interest in the sport and took a break from cycling. In spite of her doubt, she returned to training just four months later, but she wanted a change and therefore made the switch from sprint to endurance cycling. Eight months later, she had successfully made the switch by becoming the Australian Omnium and Scratch Race champion.

Her first World Championships came in 2012 at the UCI World Championships in Melbourne in which she achieved silver in both the Omnium and Team Pursuit. These results helped her secure a place in the 2012 Australian Olympic Team.

In London, she took part in two events of the Olympic Track Cycling Schedule. In the Team Pursuit, the Australian squad secured 4th place, missing out on the bronze medal. It was her effort and performance in the 6 events of the Omnium which resulted in her claiming the bronze medal.

After the Olympics, in 2013, she signed a professional road contract with Orica–AIS, in her first season with the team, she secured a major victory taking 1st overall in the Tour of Chongming Island. Her and teammates took 3rd in the 2013 World Road Race Championships TTT in Florence, Italy.

At the 2014 Commonwealth Games in Glasgow, Edmondson claimed a silver in the Individual Pursuit along with fellow athlete Amy Cure who took a bronze in the event. On the 3rd day of competition (26 July 2014), Edmondson took part in the 10 km Scratch Race, where she raced to victory taking her 1st Commonwealth Games Gold Medal and again fellow athlete Amy Cure also succeeded coming out with a silver medal from the event.

On 22 October 2014,  announced that Edmondson had signed with the team for the 2015 season, where she remained until the team disbanded at the end of the 2018 season.

Edmondson qualified for the Tokyo 2020 Olympics. She was a member of the Women's pursuit team. The team consisting of Ashlee Ankudinoff, Georgia Baker, Annette Edmondson, Alexandra Manly, Maeve Plouffe finished fifth.

Edmondson retired from competition after the conclusion of the 2021 UCI Track Champions League in December of that year, having finished third in the women's endurance standings.

Personal life
Edmondson has also had an interest in charity work from a young age. Her first recognition of her work came in 2007 in which she became "Make Indigenous Poverty History Youth Ambassador for SA". Since then, she has made personal visits to deprived areas, such as parts of Indonesia to give up her time as volunteer. She is fluent in Indonesian.

Edmondson has two brothers; her younger brother Alex Edmondson is also a professional cyclist.

Major results

Track

2007
 Oceania Junior Track Championships
1st  Sprint
1st  Team sprint (with Chloe Hosking)
1st  Scratch
 3rd  Keirin, Oceania Track Championships
2008
 National Junior Track Championships
1st  500m time trial
1st  Sprint
1st  Keirin
 2nd  Sprint, UCI Junior Track World Championships
 3rd Team sprint, National Track Championships
2009
 National Junior Track Championships
1st  Sprint
1st  Scratch
1st  500m time trial
2nd Keirin
 3rd  Keirin, UCI Junior Track World Championships
2010
 National Track Championships
2nd Team sprint
2nd Keirin
2nd 500m time trial
3rd Sprint
2011
 National Track Championships
1st  Omnium
1st  Scratch
3rd Team pursuit
2012
 National Track Championships
1st  Individual pursuit
1st  Points race
2nd Scratch
 UCI Track Cycling World Championships
2nd  Omnium
2nd  Team pursuit
 3rd  Omnium, Olympic Games
2013
 Oceania Track Championships
1st  Points race
1st  Omnium
2nd  Team pursuit
 National Track Championships
1st  Omnium
1st  Individual pursuit
1st  Points race
1st  Scratch
 1st 6 Giorni delle Rose Omnium
 1st Invercargill Scratch race
 UCI Track Cycling World Championships
2nd  Team pursuit
3rd  Individual pursuit
3rd  Omnium
2014
 Oceania Track Championships
1st  Individual pursuit
1st  Omnium
 Commonwealth Games
1st  Scratch
2nd  Individual pursuit
 National Track Championships
1st  Scratch
1st  Points race
1st  Omnium
1st  Madison (with Jessica Mundy)
2nd Individual pursuit
3rd Team pursuit
 UCI Track Cycling World Championships
3rd  Omnium
3rd  Team pursuit
2015
 UCI Track Cycling World Championships
1st  Omnium
1st  Team pursuit
 1st  Omnium, Oceania Track Championships
 1st Omnium, South Australian Grand Prix
 1st Omnium, Super Drome Cup
 1st Madison, Austral (with Julie Leth)
 National Track Championships
1st  Madison (with Jessica Mundy)
2nd Individual pursuit
2nd Team pursuit
2016
 Oceania Track Championships
1st  Team pursuit (with Ashlee Ankudinoff, Amy Cure and Alexandra Manly)
1st  Madison (with Amy Cure)
 National Track Championships
1st  Scratch
1st  Points race
2018
 Commonwealth Games
1st  Team pursuit (with Ashlee Ankudinoff, Amy Cure and Alexandra Manly)
3rd  Individual pursuit
 National Track Championships
1st  Team pursuit (with Breanna Hargrave, Alexandra Manly, and Maeve Plouffe)
2nd Madison (with Alexandra Manly)
2019
 1st  Team pursuit, UCI Track Cycling World Championships
2021
 3rd Endurance classification UCI Track Cycling Champions League

Road

2011
 8th Road race, Oceania Road Championships
2012
 National Road Championships
2nd Under-23 criterium
3rd Criterium
 8th Road race, Oceania Road Championships
2013
 1st Overall Tour of Chongming Island
1st Stage 3
 1st Stage 4 Belgium Tour
 3rd  Team time trial, UCI Road World Championships
 9th Dwars door de Westhoek
2014
 1st Points classification Adelaide Tour
 2nd  Team time trial, UCI Road World Championships
2015
 1st  Sprints classification Women's Tour Down Under
 4th RideLondon Grand Prix
 7th Overall BeNe Ladies Tour
2016
 1st Stage 2 Women's Tour Down Under
2017
 1st Pajot Hills Classic
 3rd Overall BeNe Ladies Tour
1st Prologue
 10th Overall Tour of Chongming Island
2018
 1st Towards Zero Race Melbourne
 1st Stage 1 Women's Tour Down Under
2019
 4th Dwars door de Westhoek
2021
 National Road Championships
1st  Criterium

References

External links

1991 births
Living people
Australian female cyclists
Australian track cyclists
Cyclists at the 2012 Summer Olympics
Cyclists at the 2016 Summer Olympics
Cyclists at the 2020 Summer Olympics
Olympic cyclists of Australia
Olympic bronze medalists for Australia
Olympic medalists in cycling
Medalists at the 2012 Summer Olympics
Cyclists from Adelaide
Cyclists at the 2014 Commonwealth Games
Commonwealth Games bronze medallists for Australia
Commonwealth Games gold medallists for Australia
Commonwealth Games silver medallists for Australia
Commonwealth Games medallists in cycling
Cyclists at the 2018 Commonwealth Games
UCI Track Cycling World Champions (women)
20th-century Australian women
21st-century Australian women
Medallists at the 2014 Commonwealth Games
Medallists at the 2018 Commonwealth Games